Amália Maria Alexandre is an Angolan politician for the MPLA and a member of the National Assembly of Angola. She is the coordinator of the monitoring group of the executive secretariat of the Angolan Women's Organization (WCO) for Cunene.

References

Living people
Members of the National Assembly (Angola)
MPLA politicians
21st-century Angolan women politicians
21st-century Angolan politicians
Year of birth missing (living people)